The Nisga'a Final Agreement, also known as the Nisga'a Treaty, is a treaty that was settled between the Nisg̱a'a, the government of British Columbia, and the Government of Canada that was signed on 27 May 1998 and came into effect on May 11, 2000. Bear Glacier Provincial Park was also created as a result of this agreement. Thirty-one Nisga'a placenames in the territory became official names. The land-claim settlement was the first formal modern day comprehensive treaty in the province— the first signed by a First Nation in British Columbia since the Douglas Treaties in 1854 (pertaining to areas on Vancouver Island) and Treaty 8 in 1899 (pertaining to northeastern British Columbia). The agreement gives the Nisga'a control over their land, including the forestry and fishing resources contained in it. 

The agreement was signed on 27 May 1998 by Joseph Gosnell, Nelson Leeson and Edmond Wright of the Nisg̱a'a Nation and by Premier Glen Clark for the Province of British Columbia. Then Minister of Indian Affairs and Northern Development Jane Stewart signed the agreement for the Canadian federal government on 4 May 1999.

Context
In 1887, the Nisga'a met with the then-Premier of British Columbia to challenge the way in which the Chief Commissioner of Land and Works for the Colony of British Columbia was distributing much of Nisga'a traditional land in the Nass River valley to western settlers, in spite of the Royal Proclamation of 1763, which recognized Aboriginal title in British North America and acknowledged the existence and continuity of Aboriginal self-government. By 1890, the Nisga'a Land Committee had been established. In 1913 the Nisga'a sent a Petition to the British Privy Council in London requesting that their land claims be addressed by the King. In response, the Canadian federal government passed a law making it illegal for First Nations to "retain counsel to pursue land claims". In 1973, Frank Arthur Calder and the Nisga'a Nation Tribal Council won the landmark case, Calder v British Columbia (AG) in which the  Supreme Court of Canada (SCC) ruled for first time, that aboriginal title to land existed prior to the colonization of North America. Thomas Berger successfully argued that the Nisga'a title to their traditional lands had never been extinguished. Calder was the first of a number of land claims negotiated in favour of the rights of aboriginal peoples.

The 1999, the Nisga'a Treaty acknowledged that "the Nisga'a people have lived in the Nass River Valley since time immemorial".

Role of hereditary chiefs
The Final Agreement recognized that the hereditary chiefs Simgigat (hereditary chiefs) and Sigidimhaanak (matriarchs), Adaawak (oral histories) continued to play an important role in accordance with the Ayuuk (Nisga'a traditional laws and practices).

Legal challenges
The constitutional legality of the Nisga'a Final Agreement was challenged by some Nisga'a under Laxsgiik chief James Robinson (Sga'nisim Sim'oogit) and Mercy Thomas, particularly the self-government and law-making powers of Nisga’a government.  On October 19, 2011 the Supreme Court of British Columbia handed down its decision upholding the constitutional validity of the Nisga’a Final Agreement.

References

External links

Nisga'a
Treaties of Canada
Treaties of Indigenous peoples in Canada
First Nations history in British Columbia
Treaties concluded in 1999